1 Timothy 2 is the second chapter of the First Epistle to Timothy  in the New Testament of the Christian Bible. The author has been traditionally identified as Paul the Apostle since as early as AD 180, although most modern scholars consider the letter pseudepigraphical, perhaps written as late as the first half of the second century AD.

This chapter refers to prayer (verses 1 to 7, also in verse 8) and to the behaviour of women (verses 8 to 15).

Text
The original text was written in Koine Greek. This chapter is divided into 15 verses.

Textual witnesses
Some early manuscripts containing the text of this chapter are:
Codex Sinaiticus (AD 330–360)
Codex Alexandrinus (400–440)
Codex Freerianus (c. 450; extant verses 1, 9–13)
Codex Claromontanus (c. 550)
Codex Coislinianus (c. 550)

Instruction on prayer (2:1–7)

Verse 1
First of all, then, I urge that supplications, prayers, intercessions, and thanksgivings should be made for everyone.
Clare Drury reads this verse as meaning that prayer is to be "the first duty of a member of the community". Although four words, "supplication", "prayer", "intercession", and "thanksgiving", are used, "no distinction is made between them".

Verses 3–4

For this is good and acceptable in the sight of God our Savior, who desires all men to be saved and to come to the knowledge of the truth.
"Savior" (Greek:): The second of three times in this letter (others: 1:1; 4:10) where God is called "Savior", recalling the 'well-known appellation of Yahweh in the Greek Old Testament' (for examples, LXX ; ; ; ; ; ; ;).

Men and women at prayer (2:8–15; 3:1)

Verse 12

And I do not permit a woman to teach or to have authority over a man, but to be in silence.

 "I do not permit a woman to teach" (KJV: "But I suffer not a woman to teach"): Baptist theologian John Gill interprets this in the sense that women may teach only in private, that is, in their own houses and families, to bring up their children in the nurture and admonition of the Lord, not to forsake the law or doctrine of a mother, any more than the instruction of a father (see), and they are to be teachers of good things (cf. ). Timothy surely received a lot of advantage from the private teachings and instructions of his mother Eunice, and grandmother Lois, but then women were not to teach in the church.

 "To have authority over a man" (KJV: "to usurp authority over the man"): Gill sees this as not to be done in civil and political things, or in things relating to civil government; and in things domestic, or the affairs of the family, therefore also not in ecclesiastical things, nor what relate to the church, for one part of rule is to feed the church with knowledge and understanding; and for a woman to do this, can be seen as to usurp an authority over the man.

Verse 13
For Adam was formed first, then Eve.

Verse 14
And it was not Adam who was deceived by Satan. The woman was deceived, and sin was the result.

Verse 15
But a woman will be saved through having children, if she perseveres in faith and love and holiness, with modesty.
Chapter 3 opens with the words This is a faithful saying, The saying is sure, or The saying is commonly accepted. The words may refer back to the latter part of this chapter, including this verse, or they may be read as introductory to the material in chapter 3 about the office of a bishop.

See also
 Adam and Eve
 Crucifixion of Jesus
 Jesus Christ
 Nativity of Jesus
 Related Bible parts: Genesis 2, Genesis 3, Galatians 6, Hebrews 4, Hebrews 7, Hebrews 8

References

Sources

External links
 King James Bible - Wikisource
English Translation with Parallel Latin Vulgate
Online Bible at GospelHall.org (ESV, KJV, Darby, American Standard Version, Bible in Basic English)
Multiple bible versions at Bible Gateway (NKJV, NIV, NRSV etc.)

1 Timothy 2